Frank Harris is a former running back in the National Football League. He played with the Chicago Bears during the 1987 NFL season.

References

Sportspeople from Waukesha, Wisconsin
Players of American football from Wisconsin
Chicago Bears players
American football running backs
NC State Wolfpack football players
1964 births
Living people
Sportspeople from the Milwaukee metropolitan area
National Football League replacement players